The9 (stylized as THE9 or THE NINE) was a Chinese girl group formed through the IQIYI survival show Youth With You 2.  The group consisted of Liu Yuxin, Yu Shuxin, Xu Jiaqi, Yu Yan, Xie Keyin, An Qi, Zhao Xiaotang, Kong Xueer and Lu Keran.

The9 was formed on May 30, 2020, and officially debuted on August 10, 2020. It was managed by Idol Youth Entertainment of iQIYI.  The group was supposed to disband on November 30, 2021, but they disbanded on December 5, 2021.

History

Pre-debut: Youth With You 2 

The9 was formed through the reality television show Youth with You 2, which aired from March 12 to May 30, 2020. It was the third season of the Idol Producer franchise. Out of 109 trainees from different companies, only the top 9 most voted trainees in the final episode got to debut in the final group.

On May 30, 2020, the final lineup was eventually announced. Liu Yuxin placed 1st, Esther Yu Shuxin came in 2nd, followed by Kiki Xu Jiaqi, Yu Yan, Shaking Chloe Xie Keyin, Babymonster An Qi, Zhao Xiaotang, Snow Kong Xue'er, and K Lu Keran in 9th place respectively. Since having earned 1st place, XIN Liu Yuxin was chosen as the center of the group.

2020–2021: Beginning of promotions and debut with Sphinx X Mystery and MatriX
On May 30, 2020, The9 was formed following the finale of Youth with You Season 2 and their training began the day after. Apart from training, they also filmed for several variety shows such as "My Little Forest". On June 17, 2020, they participated in Hunan Television's 618 Super Night to perform "Yes! OK!" and "Hunt", marking The9's first public performance. On July 4, 2020, the official Weibo account for the group released a video of the members selecting their team leader, revealing to be Babymonster An. They also revealed other details such as their fandom name, fandom colors as well as their hand sign.

On July 10, 2020, the group attended the "Current Business Conference" and announced their appointment as "Advance Officer for Edge Art."

The group has also done many commercials as well as editorials for magazines and high-end fashion houses. Xu Jiaqi, a former member of Chinese girl group SNH48's Team SII as well as a current member of the SNH48 sub-unit 7Senses, performed at SNH48's 7th Request Time Senbatsu General Elections as a guest.

The group released their first extended play, Sphinx X Mystery (斯芬克斯X谜), on August 10, 2020. The EP consists of the lead single "SphinX" (斯芬克斯) as well as another song titled "Not Me". The EP sold over 150,000 units in less than 45 minutes; it also won the "Double Platinum" rating. The music video for SphinX was released on August 15 via Weibo and YouTube. They promoted their EP through performances at variety shows and through music shows such as 818 Super Night. The group then announced their first variety show called “Let’s Party 2020” which would be released on iQIYI. The group released their debut studio album MatriX (虚实X境) on December 25, 2020 which features the lead single "Dumb Dumb Bomb" and nine solo tracks.

On December 31, The9 participated in the 2021 Jiangsu Satellite TV New Year's Eve concert.

From March 26 to March 27, 2021, the group held their first online concert titled "X-CITY," which garnered tens of thousands of viewers. The concert utilized XR technology to create realistic stage backgrounds.

On June 9, 2021, The9 released their first anniversary EP entitled RefleXtion. The EP consists of two tracks: "Hello" and "Xenogeneic". The group officially disbanded on December 5, 2021. Though the group had plans to hold a graduation concert, due to the COVID-19 pandemic, these shows have been indefinitely halted. There have been some word of holding the concert in early 2022, but no official announcement has been made.

Members 

 Liu Yuxin / XIN Liu (刘雨昕) - Center
 Yu Shuxin / Esther Yu (虞书欣)
 Xu Jiaqi / Kiki Xu (许佳琪)
 Yu Yan (喻言)
 Xie Keyin / Shaking (谢可寅)
 An Qi / Babymonster An (安崎) – leader
 Zhao Xiaotang (赵小棠)
 Kong Xue'er / Snow Kong (孔雪儿)
 Lu Keran / K Lu (陆柯燃)

Discography

Studio albums

Extended plays

Promotional singles

Music Videos

Filmography

Variety Shows

Concert

Awards

References

External links 
 
The9 on Spotify
The9 on Apple Music
The9 on Joox

Chinese girl groups
Youth With You contestants
Musical groups established in 2020
2020 establishments in China
Musical groups disestablished in 2021
2021 disestablishments in China